Rizz-Wa-Faire is the third solo album by Ralph Tresvant of New Edition.  It was released on March 7, 2006.  The only single from the album was "My Homegirl."

Track listing
"Sneaky"
"Love Hangover"
"Angel"
"Jungle Club"
"Strange Emotions"
"A Man Who Loves U"
"Save A Little Love"
"Slow Down"
"My Homegirl"
"Don't Act Innocent"
"Something to Give You"
"Too Cool"
"Magic Underwear"
"Better Man"
"Never Noticed"
"Another Shot"
"The End"

Charts

References

2006 albums
Ralph Tresvant albums